Templemichael is a civil parish in the barony of Slievardagh, County Tipperary, in Ireland. Historically, it was in the Poor Law Union of "Carrick-on-Suir & Callan". It is situated in the Roman Catholic Diocese of Waterford and Lismore.

Townlands of the civil parish

See also
 List of civil parishes of County Tipperary

External links
 Placenames Database of Ireland

Civil parishes of Slievardagh